The 40th Infantry Division "Cacciatori d’Africa" ( - English: Hunters of Africa) was an infantry division of the Royal Italian Army during World War II. The Cacciatori d’Africa was formed on 27 July 1940 from troops and reservists stationed in Italian East Africa. The Cacciatori d’Africa, together with the 65th Infantry Division "Granatieri di Savoia" were outside the regular Royal Italian Army chain of command, and subordinated directly to Prince Amedeo, Duke of Aosta, the Viceroy of Italian East Africa. The division dissolved on 15 May 1941 after being decimated during the East African campaign.

History 
The 40th Infantry Division "Cacciatori d’Africa" was to be formed in case of mobilization in Italian East Africa, with personnel recalled from leave, local Italian residents, and materiel stored there. The Cacciatori d’Africa was to take the form of a standard Italian infantry division of two infantry regiments, each with three battalions, a blackshirt legion with three battalions, a field artillery regiment with three groups, and various divisional service units.

However when the division was actually activated on 27 July 1940 it was unable to raise enough men and therefore never reached the planned organization: instead of nine infantry battalions it fielded only six, and instead of three artillery groups it managed to raise only one equipped with 65/17 infantry support guns.

World War II 
From its formation on 27 July 1940 until the end of December 1940, the Cacciatori d’Africa were limited to defending the fortified walls of Addis Ababa. From January 1941, after the ranks of division grew due to recruitment, the division started to take additional positions outside the walls. After the disastrous Battle of Keren on 23 March 1941, the Cacciatori d’Africa transferred its 210th Infantry Regiment "Bisagno" and its artillery group to the 65th Infantry Division "Granatieri di Savoia". On 31 March 1941, the 211th Infantry Regiment "Pescara" was placed under direct command of the Italian East Africa High Command, and sent to Amba Alagi mountain. On the same day, the divisional headquarters moved to Dessie and the remaining units of Cacciatori d’Africa were distributed to various other units tasked with the defence of the line Danakil Depression-Amba Alagi-Addis Ababa and the division received colonial battalions as replacements for its two infantry regiments. 

After Addis Ababa fell to British forces on 6 April 1941, the Cacciatori d’Africa took up a defensive positions at Kombolcha airbase and at Bati. On 17 April 1941 these defences came under attack by the 1st South African Brigade and Campbell's Scouts (Ethiopian irregulars led by a British officer). By 19 April 1941, the Italian defensive lines were in disarray due to airstrikes, allowing multiple sections to be overrun by British armoured forces on 19 to 21 April 1941. Increased shelling by British artillery forced a full abandonment of the 1st line of defences near Bati on 22 April 1941. On 25 April 1941 Kombolcha airbase fell, and Dessie was overrun on 26 April 1941, forcing the Cacciatori d’Africa divisional command to transfer to Bati and then immediately to Tendaho in the desert to the east. By 6 May 1941, the survivors of the Cacciatori d’Africa had retreated to Danakil to make a last stand. Pressure from the Ethiopian irregulars mounted in the period 7–15 May 1941, forcing the remaining Italian forces to flee to Assab, where they remained holed up until 10 June 1941. During 10–11 June 1941, all survivors of the Cacciatori d'Africa division were either killed or taken prisoner by Indian forces in Operation Chronometer.

210th Infantry Regiment "Bisagno" 
The Bisagno was sent to Āwash on 21 March 1941. It was then split on 1 April 1941: its I Battalion was sent to Dessie, ambushed by Ethiopian irregulars and annihilated on 7 April 1941. The regiment's II Battalion was sent to the south of Addis Ababa and reached Sidama Zone, where it came under command of the 25th Colonial Division. It continued to fight until it was destroyed on 22 May 1941 in the area of Sodo.

211th Infantry Regiment "Pescara" 
During fall of Dessie 26 April 1941 the Pescara manned positions at Kalaga, Ethiopia. Participating peripherally in the Battle of Amba Alagi on 4–19 May 1941, it surrendered together with other Italian units 19 May 1941.

Organization

July 1940 
  40th Infantry Division "Cacciatori d'Africa", in Addis Ababa
 210th Infantry Regiment "Bisagno", in Asmara
 Command Company
 2x Fusilier battalions
 211th Infantry Regiment "Pescara", in Addis Ababa
 Command Company
 2x Fusilier battalions
 III African CC.NN. Battalion
 XV African CC.NN. Battalion
 I African Motorized Artillery Group (65/17 infantry support guns)
 XVIII Mixed African Engineer Battalion
 Medical Section
 Supply Section
 Transport Section
 Field Post Office

17 April 1941 
 III CC.NN. Battalion
 XI CC.NN. Battalion
 XII CC.NN. Battalion
 XXXII Colonial Battalion Danakil
 XL Colonial Battalion of Gojjam
 LII Colonial Battalion of Gojjam
 Assab Garrison Battalion
 Royal Italian Navy Marines Battalion
 XI Colonial Dismounted Squadron
 XVIII Colonial Engineer Battalion
 2x batteries of Canon de 105 mle 1913 Schneider
 3x batteries of 8 cm FK M. 5
 3x batteries of 76/40 Mod 1916 RM
 2x batteries of Skoda 75 mm Model 15
 2x batteries of Cannone da 75/46 C.A. modello 34

6 May 1941 
 2nd Colonial Coastal Battalion
 Royal Italian Air Force Motorized Battalion
 Royal Italian Navy Marines Company
 4x Camel Companies
 1x Artillery battery
 Auxiliaries of the Sultanate of Aussa

Commanding officers 
The division's commanding officers were:

 Generale di Divisione Giovanni Varda (27 July 1940 - 19 May 1941, POW)

References 

 

Infantry divisions of Italy in World War II
East African campaign (World War II)
Italian East Africa
Military units and formations established in 1940
Military units and formations disestablished in 1941
Italian colonial troops